The French Pension Reserve Fund (FRR) is a public entity created by law n°2001-624 dated 17 July 2001. Its mission is to invest monies entrusted to it by the public authorities on behalf of the community with the aim of financing the pension system.
Its investment policy is to optimize returns on the investments it makes as prudently as possible. Its policy must be consistent with those collective values that are designed to promote balanced economic, social and environmental development.

Assets under management
As of December 2016 the FRR's assets are 36 billion Euros.

History
At its creation the target was to build a reserve fund of 150 billion Euro by 2020. The funds were to come from 4 sources:
 Surpluses of certain social security funds (Fonds de solidarité vieillesse)
 Privatization resources
 Mobile phone licences
 Stock market transaction tax

After initially receiving funds from the FSV and 1.2 billion from the privatization of the Autoroute company (Autoroutes du sud de la France) since 2003 the fund has been funded mainly by 65% of the investment tax of 2%. 
The fund was set up to guarantee the financial stability of: 
 The CNAV (Caisse Nationale d'Assurance Viellesse or National Pension Insurance Bank), 
 Organic (Caisse de retraite des commerçants et des chefs d’entreprises commerciales or Pensions Bank of the traders), et 
 Cancava (Caisse de retraite des artisans or Pensions Bank of craftsmen).

First payments were set to start in 2020.

Details on the FRR's role 
The FRR is a long-run investor. Its mission as conferred by law is to “manage the sums that are allocated to it, to build up reserves to help ensure the long-term future of eligible retirement plans”. 
The Fund is also responsible for the financial management of a portion of the exceptional, one-off, lump-sum contribution owed to the CNAV (Caisse Nationale d'Assurance Vieillesse).

The government has set out a timetable for the payout of the Fund's assets. Under the terms of the social security financing law 2011,“the sums allocated to the Fund are held in reserve until 1st January 2011. As from this date and up until 2024, the Fund shall each year, and at the latest by 31 October, pay 2.1 billion euros to the national social debt amortization fund (Caisse d’Amortissement de la Dette Sociale - CADES) to help finance, between 2011 and 2018” the deficits of the entities that administer the basic pension.

On this basis the FRR determines the general investment policy guidelines consistent with"the principles of prudence and risk diversification given the target timetable for utilisation of the Fund's resources, in particular the above-mentioned payout obligations".In its implementation, the aim of the FRR's investment policy is also to help finance economic actors in general and businesses in particular. This in turn helps to consolidate their prospects for long-term growth and promote sustainable wealth creation and job growth. At the same time, it is consistent with certain shared values that promote balanced economic, social and environmental development. In 2008, the Supervisory Board adopted a responsible investment strategy which seeks to enable the Fund to honour its commitments as a signatory to the UN's PRI (Principles for Responsible Investment).

Activity 
The management of its assets is entrusted to authorized investment services providers permitted to conduct portfolio management services on behalf of third parties as referred to in paragraph 4 of article L.321-1 of the monetary and financial Code.
As an administrative public establishment, the FRR is required to select its contractors using the French government procurement process (RFP procedures).
The employees are mainly coming from the asset management industry, and are specialised in investment services providers selection.

FRR's organisation
The FRR is a publicly owned, state-funded agency governed by 
 an Executive Board and,
 a Supervisory Board.

Consistent with its stated purpose and in light of the volumes of funds it manages, the FRR has set up structures of management and government intended to ensure: 
 Independence: This spirit is reflected in the Fund's status.
 Transparency: Due to the nature of the Fund's resources, its strategy and financial statements must be disclosed to the public at regular intervals. The process of awarding management mandates for the Fund's assets is conducted in compliance with official government regulations on public bidding and requests for proposals (RFPs).
 Close involvement of labor and management stakeholders and legislators in the operation of the FRR, via its Supervisory Board.

The Supervisory Board of the FRR
Supervisory Board members include legislators, labor/management stakeholders, representatives of the ministries under whose general supervision the FRR operates (i.e., the ministries of Social Security and of the Economy, Finance and Industry) and individuals with recognized credentials in fields that are relevant to Fund's stated missions. The Board, which currently counts twenty members, is required to meet a minimum of twice yearly.

Since November 24, 2011, Alain Vasselle is the President of the Supervisory Board of the FRR.

The Executive Board 
The Executive Board has three members:
 Eric Lombard – Chief Executive Officer of (Caisse des Dépôts) – President of the Executive Board of FRR,
 Yves Chevalier – member of the Executive board,
 Olivier Rousseau – member of the Executive board.
 
The Executive Board is responsible for directing the agency and for ensuring its smooth operation. It executes investment policy guidelines and ensures compliance with them. The Executive Board reports regularly to the Supervisory Board on its management of the agency, and in particular relates information on the way in which investment policy guidelines take into account social, environmental and ethical considerations.

Management Structure Chart 
 Management Structure Chart

References

External links 

 
 Foundational texts :
 Legal statement about the organisation and the management of the FRR
 "Caisse des dépôts et consignations- CDC" 's role in administrative management

Pensions in France
Economy of France
Sovereign wealth funds
Public pension funds